It Happened in Aden (French: C'est arrivé à Aden...) is a 1956 French historical comedy film directed by Michel Boisrond and starring André Luguet, Jacques Dacqmine and Dany Robin. It is based on the 1940 novel The Environs of Aden by Pierre Benoît.

The film's sets were designed by the art director René Moulaert.

Synopsis
In the late nineteenth century, a French theatrical troupe become stranded in the British colony of Aden where the officers of the garrison woo the leading stars. One of them, Albine, attracts the interest of a local Prince there to sign a treaty with the British, leading to his kidnapping her.

Cast
 André Luguet as Sir Richard Wilkinson – le gouverneur d'Aden 
 Jacques Dacqmine as Le major Burton 
 Dany Robin as Albine 
 Robert Manuel as Zafarana 
 Elina Labourdette as Simone 
 Edmond Ardisson as Le patron 
 Jean Bretonnière as Prince de Khamarkar 
 Geneviève Brunet as Margaret 
 Georges Chamarat as Le capitaine du navire 
 Maurice Dorléac
 Jacques Duby as Gremilly 
 Michel Etcheverry as Le pasteur Sanderman 
 Jacques Ferrière as Joyce 
 Madeleine Ganne
 Clément Harari as Abdullah 
 Charles Lemontier
 Michael Lonsdale as Sinclair 
 Odile Mallet as Elizabeth 
 Jacques Morlaine
 Dominique Page as Lucette 
 Laure Paillette
 Robert Pizani as Hubert Robert 
 Claude Rich as Price 
 Roger Saget as Clairville 
 Bachir Touré as Ali 
 André Versini as Lusignan

References

Bibliography 
 Hayward, Susan. French Costume Drama of the 1950s: Fashioning Politics in Film. Intellect Books, 2010.

External links 
 

1956 films
French historical comedy films
1950s historical comedy films
1950s French-language films
Films directed by Michel Boisrond
Films based on French novels
Films set in the 19th century
Films set in Aden
1950s French films